India competed at the 2004 Summer Olympics in Athens, Greece, from 13 to 29 August 2004.  The Indian Olympic Association sent a total of 73 athletes, 48 men, and 28 women, to compete in 14 sports. Men's field hockey was the only team-based sport in which India had its representation in these Olympic games. As a pleasant surprise, the shooting team came successful with a silver medal, the winner being Capt. Rajyavardhan Singh Rathore. He was the first Indian to win an individual silver medal.

Several Indian athletes came close to increasing the medal haul, finishing in fourth place, including Mahesh Bhupati and Leander Paes in tennis men's doubles and Kunjarani Devi in weightlifting women's 48 kg category.

Sanamacha Chanu originally finished fourth (women's weightlifting 53 kg category), but was disqualified after being tested positive for furosemide.

Medalists

Competitors 
The following is the list of number of competitors participating in the Games. Note that reserves in fencing, field hockey, football, and handball are not counted as athletes:

Archery 

Three Indian archers qualified each for the men's and women's individual archery, and a spot each for both men's and women's teams.

Men

Women

Athletics 

Indian athletes have so far achieved qualifying standards in the following athletics events (up to a maximum of 3 athletes in each event at the 'A' Standard, and 1 at the 'B' Standard).

Men
Track & road events

Field events

Women
Track & road events

Field events

Combined events – Heptathlon

Badminton

Boxing

Field hockey

Men's tournament

Roster

Group play

5th-8th Place Semifinal

7th-8th Place Final

Judo

Rowing

Indian rowers qualified the following boats:

Men

Qualification Legend: FA=Final A (medal); FB=Final B (non-medal); FC=Final C (non-medal); FD=Final D (non-medal); FE=Final E (non-medal); FF=Final F (non-medal); SA/B=Semifinals A/B; SC/D=Semifinals C/D; SE/F=Semifinals E/F; R=Repechage

Sailing

Indian sailors have qualified one boat for each of the following events.

Open

M = Medal race; OCS = On course side of the starting line; DSQ = Disqualified; DNF = Did not finish; DNS= Did not start; RDG = Redress given

Shooting 

Eight Indian shooters (five men and three women) qualified to compete in the following events:

Men

Women

Swimming 

Women

Table tennis

Tennis

Weightlifting 

Three Indian weightlifters qualified for the following events:

* Sanamacha Chanu originally finished fourth, but was disqualified after being tested positive for furosemide.

Wrestling 

Men's freestyle

Men's Greco-Roman

See also
 India at the 2002 Asian Games
 India at the 2004 Summer Paralympics

References

External links
Official Report of the XXVIII Olympiad
Indian Olympic Association 

Nations at the 2004 Summer Olympics
2004
Summer Olympics